The Minerva Reefs are a group of two submerged atolls located in the Pacific Ocean between Fiji, Niue and Tonga. The islands are the subject of a territorial dispute between Fiji and Tonga, and in addition were briefly claimed by American Libertarians as the centre of a micronation, the Republic of Minerva.

Name

The reefs were named after the whaleship Minerva, wrecked on what became known as South Minerva after setting out from Sydney in 1829. Many other ships would follow, for example Strathcona, which was sailing north soon after completion in Auckland in 1914. In both cases most of the crew saved themselves in whaleboats or rafts and reached the Lau Islands in Fiji.

History

The reefs were first known to Europeans by the crew of the brig Rosalia, commanded by Lieutenant John Garland, which was shipwrecked there in 1807. The Oriental Navigator for 1816 recorded Garland’s discovery under the name Rosaretta Shoal, warning that it was “a dangerous shoal, on which the Rosaretta, a prize belonging to his Majesty's ship Cornwallis, was wrecked on her passage from Pisco, in Peru, to Port Jackson, in 1807”. It noted that it was “composed of hard coarse sand and coral”, a description that must have come from Garland’s report. It also said that “from the distressed situation of the prize-master, Mr. Garland”, the shoal’s extent could not be ascertained, and concluded: “The situation is not to be considered as finally determined”. It cited different coordinates from those given by Garland: 30°10 South, longitude 173°45' East.
The reefs were put on the charts by Captain John Nicholson of LMS Haweis in December 1818 as reported in The Sydney Gazette 30 January 1819. Captain H. M. Denham of  surveyed the reefs in 1854 and renamed them after the Australian whaler Minerva which ran aground on South Minerva Reef on 9 September 1829.

Republic of Minerva

In 1972, real-estate millionaire Michael Oliver, of the Phoenix Foundation, sought to establish a libertarian country on the reefs. Oliver formed a syndicate, the Ocean Life Research Foundation, which had considerable finances for the project and had offices in New York City and London. In 1971, the organization constructed a steel tower on the reef. The Republic of Minerva issued a declaration of independence on 19 January 1972. Morris Davis was elected as the President of Minerva.

However, the islands were also claimed by Tonga. An expedition consisting of 90 prisoners was sent to enforce the claim by building an artificial island with permanent structures above the high-tide mark. Arriving on 18 June 1972, the Flag of the Tonga was raised on the following day on North Minerva and on South Minerva on 21 June 1972. King Tāufaʻāhau Tupou IV announced the annexation of the islands on 26 June; North Minerva was to be renamed Teleki Tokelau, with South Minerva becoming Teleki Tonga.  In September 1972, South Pacific Forum recognized Tonga as the only possible owner of the Minerva Reefs, but did not explicitly recognize Tonga's claimed sovereign title.

In 1982, a group of Americans led again by Morris Davis tried to occupy the reefs, but were forced off by Tongan troops after three weeks. According to Reason, Minerva has been "more or less reclaimed by the sea".

Territorial dispute

In 2005, Fiji declared that it did not recognize any maritime water claims by Tonga to the Minerva Reefs under the UNCLOS agreements. In November 2005, Fiji lodged a complaint with the International Seabed Authority concerning Tonga's maritime waters claims surrounding Minerva. Tonga lodged a counter claim. In 2010 the Fijian Navy destroyed navigation lights at the entrance to the lagoon. In late May 2011, they again destroyed navigational equipment installed by Tongans. In early June 2011, two Royal Tongan Navy ships were sent to the reef to replace the equipment, and to reassert Tonga's claim to the territory. Fijian Navy ships in the vicinity reportedly withdrew as the Tongans approached.

In an effort to settle the dispute, the government of Tonga revealed a proposal in early July 2014 to give the Minerva Reefs to Fiji in exchange for the Lau Group of islands. In a statement to the Tonga Daily News, Lands Minister Lord Maʻafu Tukuiʻaulahi announced that he would make the proposal to Fiji's Minister for Foreign Affairs, Ratu Inoke Kubuabola. Some Tongans have Lauan ancestors and many Lauans have Tongan ancestors; Tonga's Lands Minister is named after Enele Ma'afu, the Tongan Prince who originally claimed parts of Lau for Tonga.

Geography

Terrain: two atolls on dormant volcanic seamounts.

There is a small sand bar around the atoll, awash at high tide, and a small entrance into the flat lagoon with a somewhat deep harbor. Remnants of shipwrecks and platforms remain on the atolls, plus functioning navigation beacons.

Geologically, the Minerva Reefs are of a limestone base formed from uplifted coral formations elevated by now-dormant volcanic activity.

The climate is subtropical with a distinct warm period (December–April), during which the temperatures rise above 32 °C (90 °F), and a cooler period (May–November), with temperatures rarely rising above 27 °C (80 °F). The temperature increases from 23 °C to 27 °C (74 °F to 80 °F), and the annual rainfall is from 1,700 to 2,970 mm (67–117 in) as one moves from Cardea in the south to the more northerly islands closer to the Equator. The mean daily humidity is 80 percent.

Both North and South Minerva Reefs are used as anchorages by private yachts traveling between New Zealand and Tonga or Fiji. North Minerva (Tongan: Teleki Tokelau) offers the more protected anchorage, with a single, easily negotiated, west-facing pass that offers access to the large, calm lagoon with extensive sandy areas. South Minerva (Tongan: Teleki Tonga) is in shape similar to an infinity symbol, with its eastern lobe partially open to the ocean on the northern side.

Shipwrecks

The reefs have been the site of several shipwrecks. The brig Rosalía was wrecked on the Minerva Reefs on 19 September 1807. After being captured by HMS Cornwallis at the Peruvian port of Ilo on 13 July, the Rosalía, 375 tons, was dispatched to Port Jackson with seven men on board under the command of Lieutenant John Garland, master of the Cornwallis. Captain John Piper, Commandant at Norfolk Island, reported the arrival of the shipwrecked crew to Governor William Bligh in Sydney in a letter of 12 October 1807.

On September 9, 1829 a whaling ship from Australia called the Minerva wrecked on the reef.

On July 7, 1962 the Tuaikaepau ('Slow But Sure'), a Tongan vessel on its way to New Zealand, struck the reefs. This  wooden vessel was built in 1902 at the same yard as the Strathcona. The crew and passengers survived by living in the remains of a Japanese freighter. There they remained for three months and several died. Without tools, Captain Tēvita Fifita built a small boat using wood recovered from the ship. With this raft, named Malolelei ('Good Day'), he and several others sailed to Fiji in one week.

See also
 List of reefs
 Micronation

References

Further reading
 Interview with Oliver at Stay Free Magazine

External links
 Cruising Yachties Experience at Minerva (2003)
 Photo Album of Minerva (2007)
 Photo Album and underwater images of North Minerva Reef (2009)
 Website of the "Principality of Minerva" micronation, which claims the Minerva Reefs
 "The Danger and Bounty of the Minerva Reefs"
 "On passage from Minerva Reef, November 2, 2003"

Coral reefs
Reefs of the Pacific Ocean
Islands of Tonga
Tourist attractions in Tonga
Territorial disputes of Tonga
Territorial disputes of Fiji
Fiji–Tonga relations
Micronations
Artificial islands
States and territories established in 1972
1972 in Oceania
Atolls of Oceania